FKL may refer to:
 Falkland Islands Holdings, a British conglomerate
 Football Kenya Limited, a defunct Kenyan football league
 Multicultural List, a Norwegian political party
 Venango Regional Airport, in Pennsylvania, United States